Ildikó Pécsi (21 May 1940 – 5 December 2020) was a Hungarian actress. She appeared in more than one hundred films since 1961.

Selected filmography

References

External links 

1940 births
2020 deaths
People from Hajdú-Bihar County
Hungarian film actresses
Members of the National Assembly of Hungary (1994–1998)
20th-century Hungarian actresses
20th-century Hungarian women politicians
21st-century Hungarian actresses
Hungarian television actresses